Russell Brockbank (1913–1979) was a cartoonist born in Niagara Falls, Ontario. He moved to England in 1929. Brockbank was best known for his motoring, motor racing and aviation cartoons. His work was published in numerous magazines and journals, including Lilliput, Motor and Punch.  During World War II his cartoon technique was used to more serious effect to help with the subject of aircraft recognition being published in the British training journal Aircraft Recognition.

His association with Punch lasted over 30 years, and he was art editor from 1949 to 1960.

Brockbank's cartoons were characterised by a high degree of draughtsmanship and he often went to great lengths to ensure that the cars and aircraft in his cartoons were as true-to-life as possible.

The Russell Brockbank Partnership was set up by his family to commemorate his life and works.

Books
 Round the Bend (1948?)
 Up the Straight (1955)
 Over the Line (1955)
 Bees Under my Bonnet (with Ronald Collier) (1955)
 Motoring Abroad (with Rodney Walkerley) 
 More Motoring Abroad (with Rodney Walkerley)
 The Brockbank Omnibus (1957)
 Manifold Pressures (1958)
 Move Over! (1962)
 Motoring Through Punch (1970)
 Brockbank's Grand Prix (1973)
 The Best of Brockbank (1975)

References

British cartoonists
Canadian cartoonists
1913 births
1979 deaths
Artists from Ontario
People from Niagara Falls, Ontario
Canadian emigrants to the United Kingdom